Nicola Rigoni (born 12 November 1990) is an Italian professional footballer who plays as a midfielder.

Club career

Vicenza 
A promising midfielder, and younger brother of Serie A footballer Luca Rigoni, he made his professional debut in the final weeks of the 2006–07 season with Vicenza. He then spent the 2007–08 season with the Primavera (under-20) squad, and collecting another first team appearance in the season. He was permanently promoted to the first team in the second part of the 2008–09 season, and his performances led Serie A outfit Palermo to sign the player in a bid which involved also the co-ownership of Sicilian youngster and Italian under-20 international Gianvito Misuraca, who joined Vicenza from the rosanero youth system. Half of the registration rights of Rigoni was valued €990,000 and Misuraca for €240,000, made the deal involved €750,000 cash. Rigoni will spend the 2009–10 season on loan to Vicenza in order to give him a chance to play more first team football before to join Palermo.

Palermo 
He finally arrived to Palermo in July 2010, joining the pre-season training camp of the rosanero, and made his debut with the Sicilian team in the return leg of the 2010–11 UEFA Europa League playoff round against NK Maribor as a second-half substitute for Fabio Liverani. He then appeared as a used substitute also in the first Serie A league game of the season against Cagliari.

Return to Vicenza 
On 28 January 2011, he was loaned out to Vicenza for the remainder of the season.

In June 2011 Vicenza bought back Rigoni for €200,000 and Luca Di Matteo returned to Palermo also for €200,000. In January 2012 Rigoni signed a new -year contract with Vicenza.

Chievo and loans to Vicenza, Reggina, and Cittadella 
After Vicenza was re-admitted to Serie B, on 5 September 2012 Nicola Rigoni was sold to Chievo (where his brother plays) in order to raise profit for new season, for €800,000. Along with Davide Gavazzi who left for Sampdoria, they returned to Vicenza for new season. On 19 August 2013, he was signed by another Serie B club Reggina Calcio.

Monza and loans to Pescara and Cesena 
On 24 July 2019, he signed a 3-year contract with Serie C club Monza. On 26 January 2021, Rigoni moved to Serie B club Pescara on a six-month loan deal.

On 27 August 2021, Rigoni was sent to Cesena on a one-year loan. He terminated his contract with Monza on mutual terms on 20 January 2023.

Career statistics

Club

Honours 
Monza
 Serie C Group A: 2019–20

References

External links
 

1990 births
Living people
People from Schio
Sportspeople from the Province of Vicenza
Footballers from Veneto
Italian footballers
Association football midfielders
Serie A players
Serie B players
Serie C players
L.R. Vicenza players
Palermo F.C. players
A.C. ChievoVerona players
Reggina 1914 players
A.S. Cittadella players
A.C. Monza players
Delfino Pescara 1936 players
Cesena F.C. players
Italy youth international footballers